Benny Feilhaber (born January 19, 1985) is an American soccer coach and former professional player who is currently head coach of MLS Next Pro side Sporting Kansas City II, an affiliate of Sporting Kansas City. A midfielder, Feilhaber played for clubs in Germany, Denmark, England, and the United States. Born in Brazil but raised in the United States, he represented the United States internationally, including at the 2010 FIFA World Cup.

Early life
Feilhaber was born in Rio de Janeiro, Brazil. He is Jewish, and was raised in his father's Jewish religion. His paternal grandfather emigrated from the Austrian capital city of Vienna to Brazil in 1938 to escape the Nazi regime.

Feilhaber was six years old when his family moved from Brazil to settle in the United States and attended Nottingham Country Elementary in Katy, Texas. He spent approximately eight years in the New York City suburb of Scarsdale where he played for the local soccer team, the Scarsdale Lightning.  In 1996, he led the team and won the New York State Cup for the U-12 division. He attended Northwood High School in Irvine, California, where he was a standout midfielder on the school's soccer team. He also played club soccer for the Irvine Strikers, winning various youth national titles. He was coached by youth coach Don Ebert.

After graduating in 2003 he played college soccer at the University of California, Los Angeles (UCLA), where he became a mainstay in the Bruins' midfield. At UCLA he was roommates with future national teammate Jonathan Bornstein. Feilhaber made the team as a walk-on, rather than being recruited with a scholarship offer. After his second year at UCLA Feilhaber was called up by the U.S. U-20 national soccer team to play in the 2005 FIFA World Youth Championship in the Netherlands.

Club career

Hamburger SV
His performances in the tournament caught the attention of scouts from several European teams and, after representing the U.S. in the 2005 Maccabiah Games in Israel where he won a silver medal playing for it alongside Jonathan Bornstein and Leonid Krupnik, Feilhaber signed for Hamburger SV in July 2005. In the 2005–06 season, Feilhaber played with the Hamburg reserve team in the third division, or Regionalliga.

On October 12, 2006, Feilhaber made his Bundesliga debut, coming on as a second-half substitute in a 2–1 home loss to Schalke 04. His first start came on October 22, 2006, when he played ninety minutes in a 2–1 win against Bayer Leverkusen, Hamburg's first win of the season.

Derby County
On August 9, 2007, Feilhaber obtained a work permit to play for newly promoted Premier League side Derby County. His signing was completed on August 10, 2007, and Feilhaber made his debut for the club on September 17, 2007, coming on as an eightieth-minute substitute in a 1–0 win over Newcastle United.

After the sacking of manager Billy Davies and the appointment of Paul Jewell, Feilhaber saw little playing time at Pride Park. During the 2007–08 winter transfer window Feilhaber was linked with Israeli club Maccabi Tel Aviv and American club New England Revolution but neither deal was completed. Derby released Feilhaber on a free transfer after being relegated from the Premier League after only one season.

AGF Aarhus
On August 15, 2008, Feilhaber signed with Danish Superliga team Aarhus Gymnastikforening, commonly known as AGF. He made his debut for the club on September 1, 2008, coming on as a 59th-minute substitute in a 0–3 loss to FC Nordsjælland. He scored his first Superliga goal and was named Man of the Match against Randers on July 27, 2009.

During the spring season AGF struggled with injuries to key players, including Feilhaber. Feilhaber recovered slowly, but could not help the team avoid being relegated. Despite relegation Feilhaber remained at the club for the following season. Feilhaber clearly stated that he would have preferred a transfer to a bigger club, but when the transfer window closed he concentrated his efforts on the field. Feilhaber played very well in August, September, and October 2010, helping AGF to take a solid lead in the league. In the first 8 league games and 3 cup games, he scored six goals. Most notably he scored a hat-trick in the 6–3 win over Skive in a Danish Cup match. He also scored a superb goal from a free kick three minutes into added time against Køge securing a vital 3–2 win.
Feilhaber gained significant respect from the fans due to his professional attitude in the fall of 2010.

After the winter break, AGF continued their winning streak in order to secure promotion to the Danish Superliga, but Feilhaber was mostly benched with a minor injury. On April 16, 2011, on the last day of the American transfer window, AGF sold Feilhaber to MLS.

Feilhaber made his debut for AGF in August 2008 and managed to play 58 games and scoring eight goals. His performance in the white jersey paved the way for his participation in the World Cup finals in South Africa with the U.S. national team.

New England Revolution
Following his transfer to MLS, Feilhaber was assigned to the New England Revolution through the returning US National Team player allocation process. New England selected Feilhaber after both Chivas USA and Philadelphia Union had passed on selecting him.

Sporting Kansas City
Following the 2012 season, New England did not exercise his option. He was later traded to Sporting Kansas City in exchange for a 2014 MLS SuperDraft first-round pick, a 2015 MLS SuperDraft second-round pick, and allocation money. Benny quickly found success in Kansas City, featuring as a starter for the side that captured the 2013 MLS Cup.

The 2015 season saw a return to top form for Feilhaber. He became a focal point in the entire scheme of attack, being more of a playmaker than ever before. As of September 18, 2015, he had amassed in 31 competitive appearances, 12 goals and 19 assists. In November 2015, he was named one of the three finalists for both the 2015 MLS Landon Donovan MVP Award.

Los Angeles FC
Feilhaber was traded to expansion side Los Angeles FC on January 3, 2018, in exchange for $400,000 in allocation money. In 34 appearances for the franchise in its inaugural season he would score 3 goals and notch 6 assists. Despite playing all but one competitive match for the club that year, Feilhaber found himself out of contract at the end of the season and became a free agent.

Colorado Rapids
On January 11, 2019, Feilhaber joined Colorado Rapids.

Return to Kansas City
On May 8, 2019, Feilhaber was traded to Sporting Kansas City. He debuted on May 18 in a 1–1 draw with the Vancouver Whitecaps FC.

Retirement
After leaving Kansas City at the end of their 2019 season, Feilhaber officially announced his retirement from playing professional soccer on March 11, 2020.

International career
Feilhaber was called up twice to the senior United States national team for friendlies against Scotland on November 12, 2005, and Germany on March 22, 2006, but did not play in either game.

On November 30, 2006, he turned down an offer from Andreas Herzog to play for Austria and said that he would instead focus on earning a place on the U.S. national team.

On March 15, 2007, Feilhaber was again placed on the 24-man roster by coach Bob Bradley for friendly matches against Ecuador and Guatemala. Feilhaber made his first career start for the United States team in the March 25 game against Ecuador, and scored his first international goal against China on June 2. He scored the game-winning goal on a volley in the 2007 Gold Cup final on June 24 against Mexico.

After being demoted to the reserves at Derby and picking up a series of injuries, Feilhaber saw less time with the senior national team. However, Feilhaber was named to the United States Under-23 squad that competed at the 2008 Summer Olympics. He appeared as a substitute in all three games for the United States.

After more than a year since his last action with the senior team, Feilhaber was named to the United States roster for the 2009 FIFA Confederations Cup. Along with former UCLA teammate Jonathan Bornstein and fellow UCLA alum Carlos Bocanegra, Feilhaber played in the upset of top-ranked Spain in a semi-final game on June 24, 2009. He orchestrated the second goal, rounding Gerard Pique to find Landon Donovan, who found Clint Dempsey for the finish in the center. He then appeared in the final, in which the United States fell to Brazil, the country of his birth, 3–2.

Feilhaber was a part of the 23-man squad for the FIFA World Cup 2010 in South Africa. Feilhaber was used as a substitute, gaining playing time in two of the three group stage matches—a draw against Slovenia and a victory against Algeria. The United States finished at the top of Group C.  In the Round of 16, Feilhaber was substituted in for Robbie Findley in the second half of the match against Ghana. Commentators remarked on his ability to generate plays and praised his readiness to make decisions, many of which were key passes to set up chances to score. One such pass was a through ball for Clint Dempsey, who was then fouled in the box. Landon Donovan took the subsequent penalty and scored to tie the score at 1–1, although Ghana would later come back in the first half of extra time to score through Asamoah Gyan, ending the game 2–1.

Feilhaber was not called up to a national camp from January 2014 until October 2017, even during and after his 2015 MLS Landon Donovan MVP Award finalist season. This has led Feilhaber become critical of national team manager Jürgen Klinsmann and his selection of players, saying "I don't think Jurgen calls in the best players that are available to him." Feilhaber went on to mention Sacha Kljestan, Dax McCarty, Matt Hedges, and Eric Lichaj as other players performing well that have not been called up by Klinsmann. Klinsmann responded that Feilhaber was not able to perform as well as the national team staff hoped in prior camps, and saying that "He doesn't have a coach's perspective. He doesn't know how we put the pieces together. He doesn't know how we evaluate every position, how we evaluated the pieces that we need to connect."

Coaching career
On August 25, 2020, Feilhaber returned to his former youth club UCLA Bruins as an assistant manager under manager Ryan Jorden. He left the position on January 26, 2021, to return to Sporting Kansas City, becoming the Director of Technical Operations on the Sporting KC technical staff. On August 23, he was appointed U-17 manager at Sporting Kansas' academy.

Feilhaber was named head coach of Sporting Kansas City II for the 2022 season.

Personal life
Born in Rio de Janeiro, Feilhaber has stated that he supports the Brazilian team Botafogo. His father is a supporter of the team, and he has been one since a child.

He married his wife, Michele, on December 15, 2012. Feilhaber has a daughter named Sofia and a daughter named Julia.

Career statistics

Club

International

Scores and results list the United States' goal tally first, score column indicates score after each Feilhaber goal.

Honors
United States
 CONCACAF Gold Cup: 2007

Sporting Kansas City
 MLS Cup: 2013
 U.S. Open Cup: 2015, 2017

Individual
 MLS All-Star: 2015
 MLS Best XI: 2015
 In 2010 he was inducted into the Southern California Jewish Sports Hall of Fame.

See also
 Austrian Brazilian
 List of select Jewish football (association; soccer) players

References

External links

official Danish Superliga stats 

1985 births
Jewish American sportspeople
Jewish footballers
2007 CONCACAF Gold Cup players
2007 Copa América players
2009 FIFA Confederations Cup players
2009 CONCACAF Gold Cup players
2010 FIFA World Cup players
Aarhus Gymnastikforening players
American expatriate soccer players
American expatriate soccer players in Germany
American expatriate sportspeople in England
American soccer players
Brazilian footballers
American people of Austrian-Jewish descent
American people of Brazilian-Jewish descent
Brazilian Jews
Brazilian expatriate sportspeople in Germany
Brazilian expatriate sportspeople in England
Brazilian emigrants to the United States
Brazilian people of Austrian-Jewish descent
Danish Superliga players
Derby County F.C. players
Expatriate men's footballers in Denmark
Expatriate footballers in England
Bundesliga players
Maccabiah Games medalists in football
Footballers at the 2008 Summer Olympics
Hamburger SV players
Hamburger SV II players
Living people
Major League Soccer players
Major League Soccer All-Stars
Maccabiah Games silver medalists for the United States
Competitors at the 2005 Maccabiah Games
New England Revolution players
Olympic soccer players of the United States
Footballers from Rio de Janeiro (city)
Premier League players
Sporting Kansas City players
UCLA Bruins men's soccer players
United States men's international soccer players
CONCACAF Gold Cup-winning players
United States men's under-20 international soccer players
United States men's under-23 international soccer players
Association football midfielders
Soccer players from New York (state)
Los Angeles FC players
Colorado Rapids players
UCLA Bruins men's soccer coaches
21st-century American Jews
Sporting Kansas City non-playing staff
Sporting Kansas City II coaches
USL Championship coaches
American sportspeople
Brazilian American